An Affair is a 1998 South Korean film. The quiet film about a woman who falls in love with her sister's fiancé was the seventh-highest-grossing Korean film of 1998 and won the Best Asian Film award at the 1999 Newport Beach International Film Festival.

Plot
Seo-hyun is an ordinary housewife in her late thirties with a ten-year-old son and a successful architect husband. For Seo-hyun, life is a series of banal routines, but she is well provided with upper class comforts. Her sheltered life is suddenly threatened with the appearance of U-in, her much younger sister's attractive new fiancé. U-in approaches Seo-hyun and attraction evolves into a passionate affair. Seo-hyun is aware that falling for the younger man will destroy her and her family, but she cannot help herself and the new feelings that are stirring within...

Cast list
 Lee Mi-sook as Seo-hyun 
 Lee Jung-jae as U-in
 Kim Min as Ji-hyun

References

External links 
 
 
 

1998 films
1990s romance films
South Korean erotic romance films
Films directed by E J-yong
Films with screenplays by Kim Dae-woo
1990s Korean-language films
1998 directorial debut films